Jan Engelbert Tatengkeng (October 19, 1907 – March 6, 1968) was an Indonesian poet from the Pujangga Baru era. He was also the fourth Prime Minister of the State of East Indonesia.

Early life
Jan Engelbert Tatengkeng was educated at a Hollandsch-Inlandsche School (HIS, Dutch Native School) in Manganitu, a Christelijk Middagkweekscool (Christian Normal School) in Bandung and a Christian teachers' college in Surakarta, Central Java, where he learned about Tachtigers, a form of Dutch literature that later influenced most of his work.

List of works
Most of Tatengkeng's works were influenced by Tachtigers and Christianity. His best known collection of poems is Rindu Dendam (Longing For Revenge), which contains 32 poems and was first published in 1934. He also published poems in magazines.

His other works comprise works of prose and a play.

Works

Poems first published in the magazine Poedjangga Baroe
 Hasrat Hati (Heart's Desire)
 Anak Kecil (Little Children)
 Laut (The Sea)
 Beethoven Petang (Evening) Alice Nahon O, Bintan (O, Stars) Gambaran (Overview) Sinar dan Bayang (Lights and Shadows) Katamu Tuhan (God's Words) Sinar di Balik (Behind the Light) Willem Kloos Tangis (Cry)Poems first published in other magazines
 Anak Kecil (Little Children) Penumpang kelas 1 (First Class Passenger) (also known as "Traveller First Class")
 Gadis Bali (Balinese Girl) Aku Berjasa (I am Honoured) Gua Gaja (Cave of Elephant) Cintaku (My Love) Ke Balai (To The Hall) Mengheningkan Cipta (Moment of Silence) Sekarang Ini (It Is Now) Aku dan Temanku (Me and My Friend) Sinar dan Bayang (Lights and Shadows) Kepada Dewan Pertimbangan Kebudayaan (To the Council of Cultural Considerations) Aku Dilukis (I'm Being Painted) Sang Pemimpin (Waktu) Keci (The Childhood Leader) Bertemu Setan (Meeting Satan)Prose Works
 Datuk yang Ketularan (The Infected Datuk) Kemeja Pancawarna (Five-colored Shirt) Prawira Pers Tukang Nyanyi (The Journalist Singer) Saya Masuk Sekolah Belanda (I Entered a Dutch School) Sepuluh Hari Aku Tak Mandi (I Didn't Take a Shower For Ten Days)DramaLena'' (1958)

References

1907 births
1968 deaths
People from Sangihe Islands Regency
Indonesian people of Filipino descent
People of Sangirese descent
Indonesian Christians
Indonesian politicians
Indonesian male poets
20th-century Indonesian poets
20th-century male writers
Politicians from the State of East Indonesia